The Wheel is the fifth album by American western swing band Asleep at the Wheel. Produced by Tommy Allsup at Sumet-Bernet Studios in Dallas, Texas, it was released on March 14, 1977 as the group's third album on Capitol Nashville. Unlike the band's previous releases, all of which included covers of songs originally recorded by popular country and jazz artists, The Wheel features entirely original material (save for one traditional song), most of which was written by band member LeRoy Preston.

Following the release of Wheelin' and Dealin' the previous year, Asleep at the Wheel expanded to an 11-piece unit with the addition of second saxophonist Patrick "Taco" Ryan. For the recording of The Wheel, the band and Allsup opted to work entirely in Texas for the first time, rather than returning to Nashville, Tennessee. As well as being the first all-original album by the band, it is also their first not to feature multiple additional musicians, with Leon Rausch the sole guest on just one track.

The Wheel was Asleep at the Wheel's third consecutive album to register on the US Billboard 200 albums chart (on which it peaked at number 162) and to reach the top 40 of the Top Country Albums chart (on which it peaked at number 31). Just one single was issued from the record – the Rausch-featured "Somebody Stole His Body", which failed to chart. Reviews for the album were generally positive, with critics praising the "fun" nature of the music alongside the high quality of the performances.

Background
For the recording of The Wheel, Asleep at the Wheel opted not to work in Nashville, Tennessee for the first time, instead recording their fifth studio album at Sumet-Bernet Studios in Dallas, Texas where Bob Wills' final studio album For the Last Time was tracked. The band's pedal steel guitarist Lucky Oceans recalls that the album was recorded "basically live" with no overdubs, resulting in what he describes as the group's "most live sounding studio album". After the recording completed in January 1977, the album was released by Capitol Records on March 14, 1977. "Somebody Stole His Body" was released as the sole single in June 1977.

Reception

Commercial
Upon its release, The Wheel debuted on the US Billboard Top Country Albums chart at number 40 and the Billboard 200 top albums chart at number 181. It later peaked at number 31 on the country chart (12 places lower than Wheelin' and Dealin') and number 162 on the main albums chart (18 positions higher than Wheelin' and Dealin). The album also reached number 23 on the Cash Box Top 50 Country Albums chart, number 153 on the Record World Album Chart, and number 14 on the publication's Country Album Chart. "Somebody Stole His Body" did not chart.

Critical

Reviews for The Wheel were widely positive. An uncredited review of the album in Billboard magazine hailed the record as "Some more first-rate western swing ... from a group that has mastered this form," noting that it features "a powerfully authentic feel for music in the Bob Wills tradition". Similarly, Cash Box described the record as "a highly compatible coupling of country and big band sounds that assures this band its own special niche," proclaiming that "Western swing never had it so good." Both publications awarded particular praise to Tommy Allsup's production, with the former enjoying the "solid, bouncy instrumentation" throughout.

AllMusic writer Michael Ofjord awarded The Wheel four out of five stars, detailing that "The Wheel finds Asleep at the Wheel consistently making music full of fun, along with fine musicianship and a sense of purpose". In his review, he added: "What sets this record above other bands ... is a sense of integrity beneath the surface. However, that sense of purpose is never so heavy-handed that a feeling of festivity is too far away. [...] Asleep at the Wheel has made a fine record that will appeal to both the average fan and serious students of the Western swing tradition." Music critic Robert Christgau gave the album an A− grade, his highest for the band since debut Comin' Right at Ya.

Accolades
Following the release of The Wheel, Asleep at the Wheel were nominated for two Grammy Awards: the album received a nomination for Best Country Performance by a Duo or Group with Vocal, while "Ragtime Annie" was recognised in the category of Best Country Instrumental Performance.

Track listing

PersonnelAsleep at the WheelRay Benson – lead guitar, vocals
Chris O'Connell – rhythm guitar, vocals
LeRoy Preston – rhythm guitar, vocals
Lucky Oceans – pedal steel guitar
Tony Garnier – upright bass
Floyd Domino – piano
Chris York – drums
Danny Levin – fiddle, mandolin
Bill Mabry – fiddle
Link Davis Jr. – alto and tenor saxophones, accordion, vocals
Patrick "Taco" Ryan – alto and tenor saxophones, clarinetAdditional personnel'
Leon Rausch – backing vocals 
Tommy Allsup – production
Bob Sullivan – engineering
Michael Priest – design
Richard Shaughnessy – photography
Jim Fetty – photography
Kathy Card – photography
Bill Sosin – photography

Charts

Footnotes

External links

Wheel, The
Wheel, The
Wheel, The